Hiller House may refer to:

in the United States (by state)
Col. Hiram M. Hiller House, Kahoka, Missouri, listed on the National Register of Historic Places in Clark County, Missouri
Robinson-Hiller House, Chapin, South Carolina, NRHP-listed
Hiller House (N. Vine, Victoria, Texas), listed on the National Register of Historic Places in Victoria County, Texas
Hiller House (E. Church, Victoria, Texas), listed on the National Register of Historic Places in Victoria County, Texas